Collyweston is a village and civil parish in North Northamptonshire, about three miles southwest of Stamford, Lincolnshire, on the road (the A43) to Kettering. The population of the civil parish at the 2011 census was 514.

Geography
The village is on the southern side of the Welland valley east of Tixover. The River Welland, at the point nearby to the northwest, is the boundary between Rutland and Northamptonshire. British Railways closed Ketton and Collyweston railway station in 1966.

Collyweston is currently served by buses on the Stamford to Peterborough via Duddington route. The Jurassic Way and Hereward Way pass through the village to the north, crossing the Welland at Collyweston Bridge, near Geeston.

The A47 road passes through the parish to the south, with Collyweston Great Wood to the south. The road from the A47, continuing in a straight line to the village is called Kingscliffe Road.

Nature reserve
The local Wildlife Trust has a fifteen-acre nature reserve at Collyweston Quarries where Lincolnshire limestone was quarried, to the north of the A43. This has the pyramidal orchid, common dodder, greater knapweed, common rock-rose, common bird's foot trefoil, and clustered bellflower. Birds found there include the European green woodpecker and glowworms are found there in the summer.

There is also an SSSI at Collyweston Great Wood.

History
The villages name means 'West farm/settlement'. Colin is a pet-form of Nicholas who held the manor in the 13th century.

Collyweston Palace, which had been the home of Lady Margaret Beaufort, Countess of Richmond and mother of Henry VII, was dismantled in about 1640. Margaret Tudor came to Collyweston in 1503 on her way to join her husband James IV of Scotland. One of her attendants, Elizabeth Zouche married Gerald FitzGerald, 9th Earl of Kildare at the palace.

An alternative name for the village may be "Colyns Weston", in 1396.

A pub there is called 'The Collyweston Slater', an Everards Brewery pub, on Main Road. New houses have been built down a road called Collyns Way. The parish church is St Andrew's; it is a Grade II* listed building.

In the late sixteenth century, the town gave its name to the manner of wearing the mandilion 'Colley-Weston-ward' for unknown reasons.

Other Meanings
The term 'collywest' (or 'colleywest', or 'collywesson') is a derivative of Collyweston that may be used to describe either (1) anything a bit crooked, awry, wobbly, or generally disordered, or (2) opposite, wrong way, or contrary. It has been suggested that when slate had been quarried in Collyweston, they sold the nice even pieces but used the crooked poorer-quality pieces for their own homes. Hence, the village rooftops were especially disordered. In the northern US, the term 'galleywest' is widely held by their dictionaries to be a derivative of 'collywest'.

See also
 Collyweston stone slate
 RAF Collyweston

References

External links

 Collyweston Quarries Nature Reserve
 Parish Council

Civil parishes in Northamptonshire
Villages in Northamptonshire
Sites of Special Scientific Interest in Northamptonshire
North Northamptonshire